, also known by his Chinese style name , was a politician, bureaucrat and diplomat of Ryukyu Kingdom.

Ryōketsu was born to an aristocrat family called Ba-uji Yonabaru Dunchi. His father Yonabaru Ryōkyō (also known as Ba Chōtō ), was a Sanshikan from 1859 to 1871.

In 1876, Ryukyu had to break off diplomatic relations with Qing China under the pressure of Imperial Japan. Ikegusuku Anki led a mission to Tokyo to register a complaint. Yonabaru Ryōketsu was good at diplomacy and the Japanese language, so he was sent as an assistant. But the Shogunate ignored the mission. Ikegusuku Anki died in 1877, Ryōketsu succeeded him as a member of Sanshikan. Ryōketsu contacted envoys of Western countries and tried to get them involved, but there was little response. He Ruzhang and Huang Zunxian were appointed the Imperial Chinese envoy and counselor, respectively, and went to Tokyo by ship in the same year. Ryōketsu met them secretly when their ship passed Kobe, and petitioned Qing China to rescue the Ryukyu from annexation by Japan.

In 1879, Ryukyu was annexed by Japan, and later, Japan declared the creation of Okinawa Prefecture. The last three Sanshikan, Urasoe Chōshō, Tomikawa Seikei and Yonabaru Ryōketsu, all wanted to restore the Ryukyu Domain, and they struggled for this ideal until their deaths.

References

1836 births
1893 deaths
People of the Ryukyu Kingdom
Ryukyuan people
19th-century Ryukyuan people
Ueekata
Sanshikan